Vladimir Genba born 1976 is a Russian chess player. He was awarded the title International Master by FIDE in 1997.

Career
Vladimir Genba represented Russia 4 at the 39th Chess Olympiad in 2010, where he finished on 6 out of 11.

Genba qualified for the Chess World Cup 2007, where he lost to Teimour Radjabov in the first round, and the Chess World Cup 2011, where he was defeated by eventual finalist Alexander Grischuk in the first round.

References

External links

Vladimir Genba chess-games at 365Chess.com

1976 births
Living people
Russian chess players
Chess Olympiad competitors